James Pilkington may refer to:
James Pilkington (bishop) (1520–1576), Bishop of Durham
James Pilkington (politician) (1804–1890), merchant and MP for Blackburn